Guy Salem (born 23 August 1984) is a former Israeli footballer.

References

External links
 

1984 births
Living people
Israeli footballers
Hapoel Tel Aviv F.C. players
Hapoel Marmorek F.C. players
Maccabi Be'er Sheva F.C. players
Hapoel Umm al-Fahm F.C. players
Maccabi Yavne F.C. players
Maccabi Netanya F.C. players
Beitar Tel Aviv Bat Yam F.C. players
Hapoel Jerusalem F.C. players
F.C. Kafr Qasim players
Hapoel Ironi Baqa al-Gharbiyye F.C. players
Hapoel Ashdod F.C. players
Liga Leumit players
Israeli Premier League players
Footballers from Yavne
Association football goalkeepers